George Zimmerman (born 1983) is an American man known for fatally shooting Trayvon Martin in 2012. 

George Zimmerman may also refer to:
 George J. Zimmermann (1882–1938), American mayor of the City of Buffalo, New York, serving 1934–1937
 George O. Zimmerman (born 1935), Polish-American scientist and professor emeritus at Boston University

See also
 George Zimmer (born 1948), American businessman and founder of the Men's Wearhouse